HMS Dulverton was a  of the British Royal Navy, launched in 1982 and converted in 1997 into a patrol vessel. The ship was declared surplus to requirement and put on the MoD list for disposal in 2004. In 2008 she was bought by Lithuania, along with Cottesmore.

Thales was awarded the prime contractorship to upgrade the vessels with a technologically advanced minehunting system, including the hull-mounted Sonar 2193 system, propulsion, command and control systems, and mine disposal systems. The ship entered service with the Lithuanian navy in 2011 as Kuršis.

References 

 

Hunt-class mine countermeasures vessels
1982 ships